Kerrie Cartwright (born 11 April 1992) is a Bahamian female professional tennis player.

Cartwright has a career high WTA singles ranking of 916, achieved on 11 June 2018. She also has a career high WTA doubles ranking of 587, achieved on 11 June 2018. Cartwright has won one doubles ITF doubles title.

Cartwright has represented Bahamas at the Fed Cup, where she has a win–loss record of 27–14.

ITF Finals

Doubles: 4 (1 titles, 3 runner–ups)

ITF Junior Finals

Singles: 4 (1 title, 3 runner–ups)

Doubles: 8 (5 titles, 3 runner–ups)

External links
 
 
 

1992 births
Living people
Bahamian female tennis players
Sportspeople from Nassau, Bahamas